Pedro de Madrazo y Kuntz (11 October 1816, Rome - 20 August 1898, Madrid) was a Spanish painter, jurist, writer, translator and art critic.

Biography 
He came from an illustrious family of artists. His father was the painter José de Madrazo y Agudo and his mother, Isabel Kuntz Valentini, was a daughter of the Polish painter, Tadeusz Kuntze. Two of his brothers, Federico de Madrazo and Luis de Madrazo were also painters. His sister, Carlota, married the editor of the journal, El Artista, Eugenio de Ochoa.

He and his brother Federico were born in Rome, while their father was studying there on a grant from King Charles IV. His primary education began in Madrid, at a seminary school operated by the Jesuits. This was followed by legal studies in Toledo and at the University of Valladolid, where he graduated. In 1837, he and Federico traveled to Paris, then back to Rome. Shortly after, he married Manuela Rosales, daughter of the painter, Eduardo Rosales. They had three daughters and a son. During this time, he worked as an art teacher.

Later, he moved to Madrid. There, he, his brother Federico and future brother-in-law, Ochoa, created the magazine, which played a major role in establishing the Romantic style in Spain. He also contributed to most of the cultural publications of the day; including El Renacimiento, El Español, El Iris, La Cruz and La Ilustración Española y Americana.

He combined his journalistic career with legal service; as an assistant and a prosecutor, in which capacity he worked for the Spanish Council of State in 1860. From 1870 to 1871 and again from 1875 to 1880, he was that body's Secretary General. In 1888, he was a Minister with the "Tribunal de lo Contencioso Administrativo". He retired from his legal activities in 1897. Largely progressive in his youth, he became more conservative with age and, during the Restoration, belonged to the Conservative Party of Antonio Cánovas del Castillo.

In his role of art critic and historian, he promoted Gothic art as the most representative style and introduced the concept of art as an historical heritage. He also chaired a commission on the preservation of provincial historical monuments and wrote the catalogues for the Museo del Prado.

As a writer, he favored lyric poetry with a religiously moral emphasis and, occasionally, some patriotism. His major translations include Criminal Law and Political Economy, by Pellegrino Rossi, the Book of Orators, by Joseph-Marie Timon-David and History of the Consulate and Empire, by Adolphe Thiers.   

In his later life, he became director of the Museo de Arte Moderno and, in 1894, succeeded his brother Federico as director of the Real Academia de Bellas Artes de San Fernando, of which he had been a member since 1851. He was also a member of the Real Academia Española and the Real Academia de la Historia, where he served as secretary. He held honorary memberships in several institutions outside Spain.

References

Further reading 
 Francisco Calvo Serraller, "Pedro de Madrazo, historiador y crítico de arte", in, Los Madrazo, una familia de artistas (exhibition catalog), Madrid, Museo Municipal, 1985
 Enrique Pardo Canalís, "Pedro de Madrazo", in, Revista de Ideas Estéticas, vol. XXXIV, Madrid, 1951, p. 175.

External links 

 Javier Portús Pérez, Madrazo, Pedro de Enciclopedia del Museo del Prado, FAMP

1816 births
1898 deaths
Spanish jurists
Spanish art critics
Spanish translators
Spanish art historians
Spanish journalists
Writers from Madrid
19th-century translators